Gonzalo Morales is an Argentine film and television actor.

Filmography
 La Deuda interna (1988), aka Veronico Cruz
 La Última siembra (1991), aka The Last Harvest
 Cerca de la frontera (2000) aka Close to the Border
 Soleá, manchada en sombras (2005)

Television
 "Padre Coraje" TV Series, aka Brave Father John
 "Kachorra" (2002) TV Series, aka Runaway Lady

References

External links
 
 

Argentine male film actors
Argentine male television actors
Living people
Year of birth missing (living people)